Alberto Juantorena (born 3 December 1950) is a Cuban former runner. He is the only athlete to win both the 400 and 800 m Olympic titles, which he achieved in 1976. He was ranked as world's best runner in the 400 m in 1974 and 1976–1978, and in the 800 m in 1976–77, and was chosen as the Track & Field News Athlete of the Year in 1976 and 1977.

Biography

Early sports activities
As a  14-year-old, Juantorena was first considered a potential star at basketball; he was sent to a state basketball school, and was a member of the national team. Meanwhile, he had been a regional high-school champion at 800 and 1500 meters. His running talent was discovered by a Polish track coach, Zygmunt Zabierzowski, who convinced him to start running seriously. Juantorena was ready for the change because as he states himself he was a 'bad' basketball player and his idol was the Cuban sprinter Enrique Figuerola. Only a year later, Juantorena reached semifinals of the 400 m event at the 1972 Summer Olympics.

Juantorena proceeded to win a gold medal at the 1973 World University Games and a silver at the 1975 Pan American Games, both in the 400 meters. He was unbeaten in 1973 and 1974, but underwent two operations on his foot in 1975. He only seriously took up running the 800 meters in 1976, so few thought he was a candidate for the Olympic gold that year. His coach, Zabierzowski, had initially tricked him in to trying an 800 m race by convincing him the other runners needed a pacemaker.

Olympics 1976
Juantorena made it to the 800m Olympic final, and led the field for most of the race, eventually winning in a world record time of 1:43.50.  He was the first non-English speaking athlete to win Olympic gold in this event.  Three days later, he also won the 400 meter final, setting a low-altitude world record at 44.26. By winning the 400 meters, he became the first athlete since Paul Pilgrim at the 1906 Intercalated Games to do such a double at an Olympic sports event, and was the only man to do so at an officially recognized Olympics.

Subsequent athletics career
In 1977, he set another world record in the 800, running 1:43.44 in Sofia at the World University Games. He also won both the 400 m and 800 m at the 1977 IAAF World Cup.  The 400 m race was mired in controversy when the race was re-run a day after the initial race, in which Juantorena finished third, because Juantorena lodged a successful protest that his slow start had been due to not being able to hear the starter's gun. The latter race featured an epic duel with his great rival Kenya's Mike Boit, a duel that did not happen at the previous year's Olympics because of the African countries boycott.

Juantorena, now known at home as El Caballo (the horse), continued his career, although injuries meant he would never reach the same level as in Montreal. Juantorena had been born with flat feet that caused feet and back problems, and he had to have corrective surgery in 1977. In 1978 he was unbeaten at the 400 m, but suffered his first ever defeat at 800 meters. Injuries, particularly hamstring injuries, hampered his training and racing leading up to the 1980 Moscow Olympics, where he just missed out on a medal in the 400 meters, placing fourth.

At the 1983 World Championships, his last international appearance in a major event, he broke his foot and tore ligaments when he stepped on the inside of the track after qualifying in the first round of the 800 m. He returned  to training with a view to competing in the 1984 Summer Olympics. However the 1984 Summer Olympics boycott ended his last chance for competing at Olympics. Instead, he took part in the Friendship Games, the alternative to the official Olympics for the Eastern bloc countries, where he shared the gold medal in the 800 m with Ryszard Ostrowski.

After retirement
After retirement from athletics in 1984, Juantorena has served in many official capacities, including as the Vice President of the National Institute for Sports, Physical Education and Recreation for Cuba, Vice Minister for Sport of Cuba, and Vice-President, later Senior Vice-President of the Cuban Olympic Committee. He is a member of the World Athletics Council, and has also served as an Athletes' Commission Chairman and Grand Prix Commission Member.

Personal life
Juantorena is married to Yria, a former gymnast; they have five children. His nephew Osmany Juantorena is a professional volleyball player.

International competitions

1Representing the Americas
2Did not start in the semifinals

Rankings

Juantorena was ranked among the best in the world in both the 400 and 800 m sprint events over the incredible spread of 10 seasons from 1973 to 1982, according to the experts of Track & Field News.

Best performances

See also

A Step Away – Official Documentary of the 1979 Pan American Games.

References

Cited sources 
 Sandrock, Michael (1996) Running with the Legends. Human Kinetics. .

External links  

 
 
 Track and Field News Cover, September 1976.
 Track and Field News Cover, October 1977
 Track and Field News Cover, January 1978.

1950 births
Living people
Sportspeople from Santiago de Cuba
Cuban male sprinters
Cuban male middle-distance runners
Cuban people of Basque descent
Cuban people of Spanish descent
Athletes (track and field) at the 1972 Summer Olympics
Athletes (track and field) at the 1976 Summer Olympics
Athletes (track and field) at the 1980 Summer Olympics
Athletes (track and field) at the 1975 Pan American Games
Athletes (track and field) at the 1979 Pan American Games
Pan American Games silver medalists for Cuba
Pan American Games bronze medalists for Cuba
Olympic athletes of Cuba
Olympic gold medalists for Cuba
Medalists at the 1976 Summer Olympics
World record setters in athletics (track and field)
Pan American Games medalists in athletics (track and field)
World Athletics Championships athletes for Cuba
Recipients of the Olympic Order
Olympic gold medalists in athletics (track and field)
Universiade medalists in athletics (track and field)
Central American and Caribbean Games gold medalists for Cuba
Competitors at the 1974 Central American and Caribbean Games
Competitors at the 1978 Central American and Caribbean Games
Competitors at the 1982 Central American and Caribbean Games
Track & Field News Athlete of the Year winners
Universiade gold medalists for Cuba
Central American and Caribbean Games medalists in athletics
Medalists at the 1973 Summer Universiade
Medalists at the 1977 Summer Universiade
Medalists at the 1975 Pan American Games
Medalists at the 1979 Pan American Games
Friendship Games medalists in athletics